The Tolman–Oppenheimer–Volkoff limit (or TOV limit) is an upper bound to the mass of cold, non-rotating neutron stars, analogous to the Chandrasekhar limit for white dwarf stars.  If the mass of a neutron star reaches the limit it will collapse to a denser form, most likely a black hole.

Theoretical work in 1996 placed the limit at approximately 1.5 to 3.0 solar masses, corresponding to an original stellar mass of 15 to 20 solar masses; additional work in the same year gave a more precise range of 2.2 to 2.9 solar masses.

Observations of GW170817, the first gravitational wave event due to merging neutron stars (which are thought to have collapsed into a black hole within a few seconds after merging), placed the limit in the range of 2.01 to 2.17  (solar masses).

In the case of a rigidly spinning neutron star, the mass limit is thought to increase by up to 18–20%.

History 

The idea that there should be an absolute upper limit for the mass of a cold (as distinct from thermal pressure supported) self-gravitating body dates back to the 1932 work of Lev Landau, based on the Pauli exclusion principle. Pauli's principle shows that the fermionic particles in sufficiently compressed matter would be forced into energy states so high that their rest mass contribution would become negligible when compared with the relativistic kinetic contribution (RKC). RKC is determined just by the relevant quantum wavelength , which would be of the order of the mean interparticle separation. In terms of Planck units, with the reduced Planck constant , the speed of light , and the gravitational constant  all set equal to one, there will be a corresponding pressure given roughly by

At the upper mass limit, that pressure will equal the pressure needed to resist gravity. The pressure to resist gravity for a body of mass  will be given according to the virial theorem roughly by

where  is the density. It can be seen that the wavelength cancels out so that one obtains an approximate mass limit formula of the very simple form

In this relationship,  can be taken to be given roughly by the proton mass. This even applies in the white dwarf case (that of the Chandrasekhar limit) for which the fermionic particles providing the pressure are electrons. This is because the mass density is provided by the nuclei in which the neutrons are at most about as numerous as the protons. Likewise the protons, for charge neutrality, must be exactly as numerous as the electrons outside.

In the case of neutron stars this limit was first worked out by J. Robert Oppenheimer and George Volkoff in 1939, using the work of Richard Chace Tolman. Oppenheimer and Volkoff assumed that the neutrons in a neutron star formed a degenerate cold Fermi gas. They thereby obtained a limiting mass of approximately 0.7 solar masses, which was less than the Chandrasekhar limit for white dwarfs. Taking account of the strong nuclear repulsion forces between neutrons, modern work leads to considerably higher estimates, in the range from approximately 1.5 to 3.0 solar masses. The uncertainty in the value reflects the fact that the equations of state for extremely dense matter are not well known.

Applications

In a neutron star less massive than the limit, the weight of the star is balanced by short-range repulsive neutron–neutron interactions mediated by the strong force and also by the quantum degeneracy pressure of neutrons, preventing collapse. If its mass is above the limit, the star will collapse to some denser form. It could form a black hole, or change composition and be supported in some other way (for example, by quark degeneracy pressure if it becomes a quark star). Because the properties of hypothetical, more exotic forms of degenerate matter are even more poorly known than those of neutron-degenerate matter, most astrophysicists assume, in the absence of evidence to the contrary, that a neutron star above the limit collapses directly into a black hole.

A black hole formed by the collapse of an individual star must have mass exceeding the Tolman–Oppenheimer–Volkoff limit. Theory predicts that because of mass loss during stellar evolution, a black hole formed from an isolated star of solar metallicity can have a mass of no more than approximately 10 solar masses.:Fig. 16 Observationally, because of their large mass, relative faintness, and X-ray spectra, a number of massive objects in X-ray binaries are thought to be stellar black holes. These black hole candidates are estimated to have masses between 3 and 20 solar masses. LIGO has detected black hole mergers involving black holes in the 7.5–50 solar mass range; it is possible – although unlikely – that these black holes were themselves the result of previous mergers.

List of the most massive neutron stars

Below is a list of neutron stars. These include rotating neutron stars and thus are not directly related to the TOV Limit.

List of least massive black holes

Below is a list of black holes.

List of objects in mass gap 
This list contains objects that may be neutron stars, black holes, quark stars, or other exotic objects. This list is distinct from the list of least massive black holes due to the undetermined nature of these objects, largely because of indeterminate mass, or other poor observation data.

See also
 Tolman–Oppenheimer–Volkoff equation
 Bekenstein bound
 Quark star

Notes

References

Astrophysics
Neutron stars
Black holes